Udutu is an SAAS platform for e-learning, and is based in Victoria, British Columbia. The company's Udutu LMS product is used for employee training, customer training, channel training, and compliance training. Udutu also offers a course authoring tool and a PowerPoint to HTML5 converter for SCORM compatibility.

Udutu has just over 88,000 active registered users  of their authoring tool with 200,000 user-generated courses in their system.

History
Udutu's LMS and Course Authoring Tool were developed out of a Royal Roads University (RRU) initiative started in 1995. At that time, RRU was a newly established university with a mandate to grow its course offerings and student population, but with limited financial and capital resources to do so. In order to grow, RRU focused on developing software tools that could deliver coursework online.

Udutu was spun off from Royal Roads in 2007.

Features

Main features of Udutu Course Authoring Tool:
 Pre-Designed Templates
 SCORM Compliant
 PowerPoints Upload

Main features of Udutu Learning Management System:
 Authoring Tool feature
 Reporting
 Progress Measurement
 Custom Learning Path
 Gamification Option

Main features of PowerPoint to SCORM Converter:
 Preserve Effects
 SCORM Compliant

Awards
Team of the Year (2017)
Best of Elearning Award of Excellence (2015)
Brandon Hall Excellence in Learning Technology Awards (2009)
Red Herring Canada Top 50 Winner (2008)
National Technology Innovation Award – Honourable Mention (2005)

See also 
 Learning management system
 List of learning management systems
 Online learning community
 Educational technology
 M-learning
 Blended learning
 Flipped classroom
 Collaborative learning
 Distance education
 Virtual learning environment
 Learning object
 Authoring system
 Sharable Content Object Reference Model

References

External links
 Official Udutu website

Learning management systems